Lidia Redondo Ruiz de Arévalo (born 7 March 1992) is a Spanish group rhythmic gymnast. She represents her nation at international competitions.

She participated at the 2012 Summer Olympics in London. 
She also competed at world championships, including at the 2009, 2010, 2011 and 2015 World Rhythmic Gymnastics Championships. She also competed at the 2015 European Games in Baku.

Detailed Olympic results

Notes

References

External links
 
 Lidia Redondo at Rhythmic-Gymnastics.info
 
 
 
 
 http://www.zimbio.com/pictures/h1sRla0wcO8/Olympics+Day+16+Gymnastics+Rhythmic/Sz2uXHWX2TN/Lidia+Redondo
 http://www.gettyimages.com.au/photos/lidia-redondo?excludenudity=true&sort=mostpopular&mediatype=photography&phrase=lidia%20redondo

1992 births
Living people
Spanish rhythmic gymnasts
Place of birth missing (living people)
Gymnasts at the 2012 Summer Olympics
Olympic gymnasts of Spain
Gymnasts at the 2015 European Games
European Games competitors for Spain